Shawtown may refer to:

Shawtown, North Carolina, an unincorporated community
Shawtown, Hancock County, Ohio, an unincorporated community
Shawtown, Morrow County, Ohio, an unincorporated community
Shawtown, Wisconsin, a former community now a neighborhood in Eau Claire, Wisconsin